Superman vs. Predator is an intercompany crossover pitting DC Comics icon Superman against the Predator creature first seen in the 1987 John McTiernan film Predator starring Arnold Schwarzenegger.

Background (Superman) 
The character of Superman was created by Jerry Siegel and Joe Shuster during the time of the Great Depression. The "Boy Scout," whose real identity is Clark Kent, is an alien sent to Earth following the explosion of his home planet, Krypton. When Kent eventually becomes his Superman persona, he is known for his unrelenting quest to rid the world of evil and wrongdoers, saving anyone he can in the process. His history has immortalized him as one of the most popular comic book heroes of all time.

Background (Predator) 
The character of Predator, also known as The Predator or Yautja, is a science-fiction/horror antagonist originating from the 1987 film Predator. The Predator is a race of alien species who travel across the galaxy in certain times of the year to conduct hunts on fellow species they see as competition. Since his debut, Predator has become a pop culture icon, crossing over into comic books. The company of Dark Horse Comics owns the publishing rights of the character in comic book format and have released 41 unique tales thus far, not including the various number of crossovers, collected editions and reprints.

Behind the Scenes 
In the time leading up to the Superman vs. Predator crossover, companies DC Comics and Dark Horse Comics had already established a healthy partnership, beginning with their first joint comic book series, 1991's Batman Versus Predator. This crossover was shortly followed by DC Comics pitting Superman against Dark Horse Comics characters Aliens, the same species from the science-fiction film series. The plan from both companies was to eventually have Superman and The Predator fight each other, which came to fruition in the year 2000.

Plot

A S.T.A.R. Labs expedition uncovers an ancient derelict spacecraft in the jungles of Central America.  Superman investigates the ship and is afflicted by an alien virus causing his powers to fluctuate wildly.  The group is captured by a band of mercenaries working for a clandestine scientist.  He plans to use the alien technology to facilitate selective global genocide based on genetic sequencing, but he didn't count on one thing - the meanest alien hunter in the galaxy!  The Predator senses Superman is a worthy opponent and begins stalking him while concurrently seeking to reclaim the stolen technology appropriated by the scientist.  It's a race against time for Superman to save countless millions of lives.

Collected editions
The series has been collected as a trade paperback:

Superman vs. Predator (by David Michelinie and Alex Maleev, DC Comics, 3-issue mini-series, 2000, tpb, 2001)

Other Crossovers 
Since the character of The Predator clashed with Superman, the alien hunter experienced other comic book crossovers. This included fighting the JLA in JLA versus Predator and when he shared the spotlight with the Aliens against the World's Finest in Superman and Batman versus Aliens and Predator.

See also

Batman Versus Predator
Superman/Aliens
Superman and Batman versus Aliens and Predator
Superman/Batman
Aliens Versus Predator
Batman/Aliens
Batman: Dead End

References

External links
DC page

2000 comics debuts
Comics by David Michelinie
Crossover comics
DC Comics limited series
Dark Horse Comics limited series
Intercompany crossovers
Predator (franchise) comics
Superman titles